Tankersley Tavern, also known as Old Bridge, is a historic building located near Lexington, Rockbridge County, Virginia. It was built in three sections with the oldest dated to about 1835.  It is a two-story, nine-bay, single pile, frame building with an exposed basement and a decorative two-level gallery on the front facade. Also on the property are the contributing washhouse/kitchen, three frame sheds and a stone abutment for a bridge. It was originally built as a toll house (toll gate) at the county end of the bridge crossing the Maury River from the Valley Turnpike into Lexington.  It later housed a tavern, canal ticket office, general store, post office, and dwelling.

It was listed on the National Register of Historic Places in 1988.

References

Commercial buildings on the National Register of Historic Places in Virginia
Commercial buildings completed in 1835
Buildings and structures in Rockbridge County, Virginia
National Register of Historic Places in Rockbridge County, Virginia
1835 establishments in Virginia